Snowden Mountain is a  mountain summit located in the Brooks Range, in the U.S. state of Alaska.

Description

The mountain is situated 13 miles north of Sukakpak Mountain, 100 miles north of the Arctic Circle, and 200 miles north-northwest of Fairbanks. The peak lies along the east side of the Dietrich River valley, and can be seen from the Dalton Highway which traverses the valley.

The peak is set in the Snowden Mountain Area of Critical Environmental Concern, which is managed by the Bureau of Land Management. This ACEC is extremely rugged and was established to protect Dall sheep habitat on the southern slope of the Brooks Range.

The peak is named in association with Snowden Creek heading on its southeast slope, which in turn was named in 1939 by Robert Marshall for his Eskimo friend and hunting partner, Nutirwik, also known as Harry Snowden. The name has been officially adopted by the U.S. Board on Geographic Names.

Climate

Based on the Köppen climate classification, Snowden Mountain is located in a subarctic climate zone with long, cold, winters, and short, cool summers. Winter temperatures can drop below −30 °F with wind chill factors below −50 °F. Precipitation runoff from the mountain drains west into the Dietrich River. The months June through August offer the most favorable weather for viewing and climbing.

See also

Brooks–British Range tundra
Geography of Alaska

References

External links
 Weather forecast: Snowden Mountain
 Harry Snowden photo

Mountains of Alaska
Landforms of Yukon–Koyukuk Census Area, Alaska
Brooks Range
North American 1000 m summits